The Women's Arena Football League (WAFL) was an 8-on-8 full contact professional American football league based out of Houston, Texas.   Founded in 2011, games were played in the spring and summer months in arenas around the United States.  The league is somewhat similar to the male-based Arena Football League and Indoor Football League, but with slightly different rules as well as no goalposts or rebound nets.  It began play in 2012 with six teams.  The founder and league president is Ivan Tompkins, Dwayne Ware Coach and former AFL player with the Houston Thunderbears and head coach of the charter Houston Lady Oilers.  Their championship game is known as the Diva Bowl.

The WAFL was created as a more family-friendly alternative to the rival Legends Football League.  As opposed to the lingerie (later bikini wear) worn by the players in the LFL, the WAFL's players wore more traditional women's athletic gear.

Following their inaugural season in 2013, the WAFL went dormant in preparations for a future return.

Team history
 Atlanta Archers
 Dallas Darlings
 San Antonio Estrella
 Houston Lady Oilers (named for the former National Football League franchise now known as the Tennessee Titans)
 New Orleans Bayou Queens 
 Jacksonville Cougars
 Orlando Eclipse
 Tampa Bay Duchess

Sources
 Women's Arena Football League Adds New Dimension to Expanding Female Game, Mark Staffieri, The Bleacher Report, Jun 21, 2013

References

External links
 Women's Arena Football League official website
 Women's Arena Football League official Facebook

Defunct indoor American football leagues in the United States
Sports leagues established in 2012
2012 establishments in Texas
Women's American football leagues